Osama Hussain, is a Kuwaiti football Right-back, centre-back.  Osama finished his career at Al Arabi.  He retired in 30/5/2002 in (Kuwait×Iran) Match which was finished (1-3) for Iran.

Al Arabi
He Joined Al Arabi in 1984, first he played in Al Arabi U14. After that when he grow up and reach 16 years he was able to play for Al Arabi first team. He played his first match against Al Kuwait when he was 16, and he scored his first goal against Al Salmiya in 1987.

National team
In 1990 Luiz Felipe Scolari choose him to Kuwait national football team when he was 18. he played in The Gulf Cup, AFC Asian Cup, Olympic Games and the Asian Games.  He played 95 matches with Kuwait.  He retired in 30/5/2002 against Iran national football team in a match which was finished (1-3) for Iran.

He competed for Kuwait at the 1992 Summer Olympics in Barcelona.

References

External links
 

1970 births
Living people
Kuwaiti footballers
Olympic footballers of Kuwait
Footballers at the 1992 Summer Olympics
Footballers at the 1990 Asian Games
Kuwait international footballers
Al-Arabi SC (Kuwait) players
Association football defenders
Asian Games competitors for Kuwait
Kuwait Premier League players